Singapore competed at the 1996 Summer Olympics in Atlanta, United States.

Results by event

Athletics
Women's Marathon
 Yvonne Danson — 2:39.18 (→ 38th place)

Men's Competition
 Wong Yew Tong

Badminton
Women's Competition
 Zarinah Abdullah

Sailing
 Benedict Tan
 Siew Shaw Her
 Charles Lim
 Tracey Tan

Shooting
 Lee Wung Yew

Swimming
Men's 200m Individual Medley
 Desmond Koh
 Heat — 2:08.99 (→ did not advance, 32nd place)

Men's 400m Individual Medley
 Desmond Koh
 Heat — 4:36.87 (→ did not advance, 26th place)

Men's 100m Butterfly

Thum Ping Tjin

Men's 200m Butterfly

Thum Ping Tjin

Men's 4 × 200 m Freestyle Relay

 Ju Wei, Gerald Koh, Desmond Koh, and Thum Ping Tjin
 Heat — 7:54.19 (→ did not advance, 16th place)

Men's 4 × 100 m Medley Relay
 Gerald Koh, Desmond Koh, Thum Ping Tjin, and Ju Wei
 Heat — 3:59.51 (→ did not advance, 23rd place)

Women's 100m Freestyle
 Joscelin Yeo
 Heat — 58.87 (→ did not advance, 42nd place)

Women's 100m Butterfly
 Joscelin Yeo
 Heat — 1:02.71 (→ did not advance, 24th place)

Women's 200m Individual Medley
 Joscelin Yeo
 Heat — 2:21.76 (→ did not advance, 32nd place)

Table tennis
Women's Competition
 Jing Jun Hong

References
 Official Olympic Reports
 sports-reference

Nations at the 1996 Summer Olympics
1996
1996 in Singaporean sport